George McWhirter (born September 26, 1939) is an Irish-Canadian writer, translator, editor, teacher and Vancouver's first Poet Laureate.

The son of a shipyard worker, George McWhirter was raised in a large extended family on the Shankill Road in Belfast. He and his extended family spent the war years and then weekends and the summers at their seaside bungalow in Carnalea, now a suburb of Bangor, County Down.  In 1957 he began a "combined scholarship" studying English and Spanish at Queen's University, Belfast, and education at Stranmillis College, Belfast. His tutor at Queen's was the poet Laurence Lerner, and he was a classmate with the future literary critic Robert Dunbar and the poets Seamus Heaney and Seamus Deane. After graduating, McWhirter taught in Kilkeel and Bangor, County Down, Northern Ireland, and in Barcelona, Spain, before moving to Port Alberni, B.C. Canada. After receiving his M.A. from the University of British Columbia (UBC), where he studied under Michael Bullock and J. Michael Yates, he stayed on to become a full professor in 1982 and head of the Creative Writing Department from 1983 to 1993.  He retired as a Professor Emeritus in 2005.  He was associated with PRISM international magazine from 1968 to 2005. McWhirter is the author and editor of numerous books and the recipient of many awards. His first book of poetry, Catalan Poems, was a joint winner of the first Commonwealth Poetry Prize with Chinua Achebe's Beware, Soul Brother. He was made a life member of the League of Canadian Poets in 2005 and is also a member of the Writers' Union of Canada and PEN International. 
In March 2007, he was named Vancouver's inaugural Poet Laureate for a two-year term. He currently writes full-time and lives in Vancouver with his wife. They have two children and three grandchildren.

Bibliography

Poetry
Catalan Poems (1971, winner of the 1972 Commonwealth Poetry Prize, shared with Chinua Achebe)
Queen of the Sea (1976)
Twenty-Five (1978)
The Island Man (1981)
Fire before Dark (1983)
A Staircase for All Souls (1996)
Incubus: The Dark Side of the Light (1997)
The Book of Contradictions (2002)
The Incorrection (2007, finalist for the Dorothy Livesay Poetry Prize)
The Anachronicles (2008)

Fiction
Bodyworks (1974)
God's Eye (1981)
Coming to Grips with Lucy (1982)
A Bad Day to Be Winning (1984)
Paula Lake (1985)
Cage (1987, winner of the Ethel Wilson Fiction Prize)
The Listeners (1991)
Musical Dogs (1996)
A Gift of Women (2014)

Anthologies edited
Contemporary Poetry of British Columbia (1970, with J. Michael Yates and Andreas Schroeder)
Words From Inside: Prison Arts Foundation (1974, 1975)
Where Words Like Monarchs Fly: A Cross-generational Anthology of Mexican Poets in Translation (1998)
A Verse Map of Vancouver (2009)

Selected poems edited and translations
Jose Emilio Pacheco: Selected Poems (New Directions, New York, 1987, winner of the F.R. Scott Prize for Translation)
Eyes to See Otherwise/Ojos de Otro by Homero Aridjis (Carcanet Press, 2001, New Directions, New York, 2002, with Betty Aridjis)
Solar Poems/Poemas Solares by Homero Aridjis (City Lights, San Francisco, 2010)
Tiempo de angeles/Time of Angels by Homero Ardjis, Contributions by Francisco Toledo (City Lights, San Francisco, 2012)
The Selected Poetry of Gabriel Zaid (Paul Dry Books, Philadelphia, 2014)
Poemas traducidos by Gabriel Zaid, George McWhirter: Principal English Translator (El Colegio Nacional, Mexico,2022)
self-portrait in the zone of silence by Homero Aridjis (New Directions, New York, 2023)

In Anthology
 New Generation Poetry (Ann Arbor Review Book, 1971)
 Soundings '72 (Blackstaff Press, 1972)
 The Wearing of the Black An Anthology of Contemporary Ulster Poetry (Blackstaff Press, 1974)
 The Penguin Book of Canadian Verse (Penguin Books, 1975)
 New: West Coast: 72 Contemporary BC Poets (Intermedia,1977)
 The Poets of Canada (Hurtig,1978)
 Ilusion Two: fables, fantasies and metafictions (Aya Press,1983)
 Shoes and Shit: STORIES FOR PEDESTRIANS (Aya Press, 1984)
 Vancouver Soul of a City (Douglas & McIntyre, 1986)
 Moving Off the Map: from "story" to "fiction" (Black Moss Press,1986)
 The Blackstaff book of Short Stories (Blackstaff Press, 1988)
 Compañeros: An Anthology of Writings about Latin America (Cormorant Books,1990)
 The Second Book of Blackstaff Short Stories (Blackstaff Press, 1991)
 Best Canadian Stories (Oberon Press, 1991)
 Witness to Wilderness: The Clayoquot Sound Anthology (Arsenal Pulp Press, 1994)
 Thru the Smoky End Boards: Canadian Poetry About Sports & Games (Polestar, 1996)
 Irish Writing in the Twentieth Century (Cork University Press, 2000)
 When I Was a Child:Stories for Grown-ups and Children (Oberon Press, 2003)
 THE BLACKBIRD'S NEST An Anthology of Poetry from Queen's University Belfast (Blackstaff Press, 2003)
 In Fine Form The Canadian Book of Form Poetry (Polestar, 2005)
 LONG JOURNEY Contemporary Northwest Poets (OSU Press, 2006)
 JAILBREAKS: 99 Canadian Sonnets (Biblioasis, 2008)
 ROCKSALT: An Anthology of Contemporary BC Poetry (Mother Tongue Press, 2008)
 How the Light Gets in ... Anthology of Poetry from Canada (Waterford Institute of Technology, Ireland, 2009)
 The Stony Thursday Book: A Collection of Contemporary Poetry (Limerick, Ireland, 2010)
 Making Waves: Reading BC and Pacific Northwest Literature (Anvil Press,2010)
 CVC Carter V. Cooper Short Fiction Anthology Series Book Three (EXILE editions,2013)
 Naked in Academe: Celebrating Fifty Years of Creative Writing at UBC (McClelland & Stewart,2014)
 CLI FI:Canadian Tales of Climate Change (EXILE editions, 2017)
 Legions of the Sun: Poems of the Great War edited with an introduction by JOSEPH HUTCHISON  (Harmony Hill Press, 2018)
 Ghost Fishing: An Eco-Justice Poetry Anthology (University of Georgia Press, 2018)

Plays
 1981 "Don't Go Walking on the Water", Vancouver: CBC Radio Network
 1981 "The Listeners", Vancouver: CBC Radio Network
 2009 "Hecuba" by Euripides (translation), produced by Blackbird Theatre at the Vancouver East Cultural Centre
 2016  "The House of Bernarda Alba" by Federico Garcia Lorca, (translation) workshop and reading at the Carnegie Centre, organized by Luisa Jojic and directed by Rachel Peake.

See also

List of Northern Irish Writers
The Canadian Who's Who
The Oxford Companion to Canadian Literature 1997
The Concise Oxford Companion to Canadian Literature 2001

References

External links
Teaching Tributes: http://www.ccfi.educ.ubc.ca/publication/insights/v09n02/poet/resident/tribute.html
Reading Poetry: http://www.ccfi.educ.ubc.ca/publication/insights/v08n01/poet/resident.html
Video of introduction to City Council and presentation as first Vancouver Poet Laureate: http://cityofvan-as1.insinc.com/ibc/mp/md/open/c/317/1198/200703131345wv150en,001
Writing Poetry:http://www.canlit.ca/canlitpoets.php?page=poems&poemid=207)

Poets Laureate of places in Canada
Northern Ireland emigrants to Canada
Writers from Belfast
1939 births
Living people
Canadian male poets
20th-century Canadian poets
21st-century Canadian poets
20th-century Canadian male writers
21st-century Canadian male writers
Alumni of Stranmillis University College
Alumni of Queen's University Belfast